Amigos para la aventura (English language: Friends for the Adventure) is a 1978  Argentine comedy film directed by Palito Ortega and written by Víctor Sueiro.

Cast
Palito Ortega
Carlos Monzón
Juan Carlos Altavista
Raúl Rossi
Alberto Anchart
Vicente La Russa
Iris Láinez
Cristina Alberó
Mercedes Yardín
Emilio Vidal
Délfor
Norberto Draghi
Isidro Fernán Valdez
Héctor Gance
Francisco Gómez

External links

1978 films
1978 comedy films
1970s Spanish-language films
Argentine comedy films
1970s Argentine films